The 1998 Romanian Open was a men's tennis tournament played on Clay in Bucharest, Romania that was part of the International Series of the 1998 ATP Tour. It was the sixth edition of the tournament and was held from 14 September – 21 September.

Seeds
Champion seeds are indicated in bold text while text in italics indicates the round in which those seeds were eliminated.

Draw

Finals

References

External links
 Draw

Singles
Romanian Open
1998 in Romanian tennis